The Ahliah school is a private, coeducational school in Beirut, Lebanon.

Mary Kassab School
In 1916, when the Ottoman authorities ordered the closing of foreign schools, Mary Kassab gathered in her home sixteen boys and girls who were enrolled at the British School and pledged to ensure their continuing education. Parents began to send their children to her, which became the nucleus of Ahliah School.

The following year, sixty students were enrolled, and Mary Kassab was authorized to open a national, non-denominational and coeducational school.

With the help of her brother Aziz and two of his friends, Boulos Khawli and Anis Makdissi, she formed a board of trustees. The board raised funds from Lebanese and Arab residents and Lebanese emigrants, and were able to purchase the present campus of Ahliah from the Scottish mission.

The school embraced the new scouting movement which included all Lebanese children and Alice Abkarios at Ahliah undertook the translation of the scouting rules into Arabic.

The Mandate authorities tried to tighten their control over the school and in 1924 they ordered its closing. The students (predominantly girls) organized a rally and walked into the Government Palace to defend the cause of the school before the High Commissioner. The French authorities repealed the decision.

Al-Ahliah Girls’ College
In 1950, Mary Kassab School became Ahliah Girls’ College. Boys were admitted at the elementary level only. The second principal, Wadad Makdisi Cortas, took office in 1935.

A music academy was started, under the leadership of Alexis Boutros. Ahliah's choir represented Lebanon in many capitals of the world, with some one hundred performances on their record.

The Ford Foundation equipped the school's science laboratories as a model.

Al Ahliah School in Beirut
Situated in the heart of old Beirut, Al-Ahliah found itself at the center of battles during the Lebanese Civil War (1975–1990) and its buildings sustained heavy damage. The demography of the neighborhood changed dramatically, to include the families of the displaced. Its academic standards also suffered severely because of the departure of many of its faculty and students.

For the first and most violent two years of the war, al-Ahliah closed. It reopened in 1977, under the leadership of Mr. Nicholas Zayyat, previously a teacher of mathematics of senior classes at the school.

Throughout the war years, the main concerns of Mr. Zayyat together with other members of the school administration were to guarantee the security of students and to preserve the school's buildings and infrastructure. Unable to keep former academic standards, Mr. Zayyat was keen on continuing the humanitarian and patriotic mission of the school by providing education to the numerous severely disadvantaged students and to children of parents reduced by the war to becoming squatters in its vicinity, though often these parents were unable to pay full fees. Eventually wartime Al-Ahliah had 750 students enrolled. By this time it had become coeducational.

Despite the dangers and insecurities faced, the idea of moving the school from its historic location was repeatedly rejected by Al-Ahliah's Board of Trustees.

Post civil war improvements
After the war ended and the country settled back into peaceful times that also witnessed the rebuilding of downtown Beirut, the Board of Trustees of Al- Ahliah began reviving and modernizing its mission. A new principal, Dr. Najla Hamadeh, a graduate of the school's golden age and a member of its Board of Trustees, was appointed to execute its revival. During Hamadeh's tenure (1999–2005), Al-Ahliah accomplished the following:

 changes to the faculty and administration, which led to a considerable improvement in academic standards and services
 founding a renewed preschool that employed Montessori techniques and equipment
 refurbishing the school buildings, in accordance with Solidere criteria, together with renovation of science laboratories and preschool facilities
 closing down the French language section which had been created to satisfy war conditions and needs, in order to focus on building a strong English section, while retaining French as a strong third language
 founding an informary, two additional activity halls and a day-care for the infants of faculty and staff
 developing a center for students with psychological and educational needs and for remedial and individual academic support

Campus
The campus consists of two buildings purchased in 1916 from a Scottish mission. The buildings surround an inner courtyard, which serves as a school gathering place and offers space for sports and other activities. Ahliah's buildings were fully renovated in 2003–2004.

The main older building houses the administrative offices on the ground floor. The first floor was completely restored and includes the preschool and the resource room. The second floor has two assembly halls, the information technology lab and the iEARN conference room.

Ahliah's second building is a three-winged and three-storied structure equipped with an elevator. The infirmary and elementary school cafeteria are on the ground floor with the elementary classrooms, the teachers’ lounge and the library on the first floor. The second floor houses the middle school classrooms, the photocopy room, the Art room and the Science labs. The secondary school classrooms and teachers’ lounges, the technology lab and the dance hall are located on the third floor. The roof provides additional school-yard space for older students and a cafeteria, servicing secondary school students.

Private schools in Lebanon